Sceloporus acanthinus, Bocourt's spiny lizard, is a species of lizard in the family Phrynosomatidae. It is found in Mexico and Guatemala.

References

Sceloporus
Reptiles of Mexico
Reptiles of Guatemala
Reptiles described in 1873
Taxa named by Marie Firmin Bocourt